Home Afrika is a leading real estate company based in Nairobi, Kenya. Its name is abbreviated to HAFR. Home Afrika is listed on the Nairobi Stock Exchange (NSE) under the 'Growth Enterprise Market Segment' (GEMS). Home Afrika engages in the development and sale of real estate properties.

Overview
Home Afrika started as an investment club in July 2008 before steadily growing to become a public company worth well over US$100 million as of 15 July 2013 when it listed on the NSE. The company was the first to list in the GEMS section of the NSE. 

The company's developments include Morningside Office Park in Nairobi; Migaa, a live-in-golf community in Kiambu County; Lakeview Heights in Kisumu County; Llango in Kwale County; and Kikwetu in Machakos County.

Member companies
The companies that comprise the Home Afrika include, but are not limited, to the following:

 Suburban Limited - Kenya - 50% Shareholding - Real estate development
 Mitini Scapes Development Limited - 100% Shareholding - Real Estate Development
 Lakeview Heights Development Limited - 100% Shareholding - Real Estate Development
 Lango Development Limited - 100% Shareholding - Real Estate Development
 Kikwetu Limited - 100% Shareholding - Real Estate Development
 Home Afrika Communities Limited - Kenya - 60% Shareholding - Real Estate Development
 Migaa Management Limited - Kenya - 52% Shareholding - Real Estate Development

Ownership
Home Afrika with its subsidiaries, which it owns, either wholly or partially, form the Home Afrika Group. The stock of the group is traded on the Nairobi Stock Exchange (NSE), under the symbol: HAFR.

Governance
Home Afrika is governed by an eleven-person Board of Directors with Lee Karuri serving as the chairman and Dan Awendo as the CEO.

External links
 Home Afrika Website
 Nairobi Securities Exchange Website 
 Rich Management

See also
Nairobi Securities Exchange

References

Real estate companies of Kenya
Companies listed on the Nairobi Securities Exchange
Companies based in Nairobi
Kenyan companies established in 2008
Real estate companies established in 2008